INHS Sanjivani is a multi-speciality hospital of the Indian Navy at Kochi, Kerala under the Southern Naval Command. It is the largest military hospital in the states of Kerala and Tamil Nadu. It is the nodal hospital for ships and other naval units at Kochi. The hospital also provides medical cover and aid to civil authorities as required, including disaster relief operations. In 2019, INHS Sanjivani was adjudged the best Naval Hospital in India.

History 

INHS Sanjivani was commissioned as a 75-bed facility on 8 March 1958. The bed strength has increased since the inception of the hospital and now stands at 333. In May 2016, a state-of-the-art MRI center was inaugurated at the hospital.

See also 
 List of Armed Forces Hospitals In India
 Indian Navy
 Southern Naval Command

References 

Military hospitals in India
Patan